Mel Knight is a Welsh radio presenter, who presents popular Red Dragon FM radio show 'The Full Welsh Breakfast', together with her partner Jason 'Jase' Harrold.

Biography 
Mel has worked on Red Dragon's breakfast show since October 2005 with Jase Harrold.

Before joining Red Dragon, Mel worked as a holiday rep and in sales.

It is known that she is fond of drama, drinking and rugby, in which she has played as a flanker for a women's team.

She is recently married to Matthew with whom she lives in Cardiff.

External links 
Biography on Red Dragon's website

Welsh radio presenters
Living people
Year of birth missing (living people)
Mass media people from Cardiff